Lieutenant-Colonel Francis Spring Walker  (6 January 1876 – 24 June 1941) was a British Army officer.

He was born into an Anglo-Irish gentry family in County Kerry, United Kingdom of Great Britain and Ireland in 1876.

He received his diploma for Licentiate Midwifing from the Royal College of Surgeons of Ireland in 1898. He was also educated at Trinity College, Dublin.

He was commissioned into the Royal Army Medical Corps on 25 April 1900 and served in the Second Boer War in the Orange River Colony and Cape Colony from June to December 1900 before being invalided.

Between 1902-03, when his health broke down and he had to go on half-pay for 8 months, and 1905-1908 he served in India and was promoted to Captain 25 April 1903. He was stationed at Ferozepore in 1908. He was promoted to Major 25 April 1912. With the outbreak of the First World War in 1914, Spring Walker sailed to France with the 16th Field Ambulance  of the British Expeditionary Force on 11 September 1914, where he served until 15 January 1915 when he was invalided.

On 17 February 1915, he was Mentioned in Dispatches for the first time. He served in the Gallipoli Campaign as a medical officer in command of the Hospital Carrier Vladivian at Suvla Bay and Malta 1915-16 as O.C. No. 3 Convalescent Camp, Ghain Tuffeyh, Malta.

Back in the UK he was the O.C. Military Hospital, Taunton and Military Hospital Cork.

He was promoted to Lieutenant-Colonel 26 December 1917.

On 3 June 1919, he was decorated as a Commander of the Order of the British Empire. On 10 and 29 July that same year, he was Mentioned in Dispatches for a second and third time. He retired from the army in May 1920, but remained on the officer reserve list until 1922. He returned to County Cork, Ireland, where he died in 1941.

References
Entry No: 127. Drew R, 1968. Commissioned Officers in the Medical Services of the British Army 1660–1960, Vol II Roll of Officers in the RAMC 1898–1960 London, Wellcome Historical Library.
Succession Books Vol XX, Returns of statement of service of RAMC Officers.

1876 births
1941 deaths
Royal Army Medical Corps officers
Francis
British Army personnel of World War I
British Army personnel of the Second Boer War
Commanders of the Order of the British Empire
20th-century Anglo-Irish people